Musbah bin Jamli is a Malaysian politician who served as the State Minister of Resources and Information Technology Development. He served as the Member of Sabah State Legislative Assembly (MLA) for Tempasuk from March 2008 until September 2020.

Election results

Honours
  :
  Commander of the Order of Kinabalu (PGDK) (2003)

References

Members of the Sabah State Legislative Assembly
Former United Malays National Organisation politicians
Living people
Year of birth missing (living people)
Former Sabah Heritage Party politicians
Bajau people
Independent politicians in Malaysia
Commanders of the Order of Kinabalu